The Chrysler Design Awards celebrate the achievements of individuals in innovative works of architecture and design which significantly influenced modern American culture.
Chrysler's awards  started in 1993 to recognize six designers based in the United States with a trophy and $10,000 cash prize. After 10 years in 2003 Chrysler corporation decided to end its Chrysler Design Awards program.

List of Awardees

2002 
Red Burns
Mildred (Mickey) Friedman
Steve Jobs
Phyllis Lambert
Murray Moss
Daniel Patrick Moynihan

2001 
Kathryn Gustafson
Susan Kare
Thom Mayne
Daniel Rozin
Stefan Sagmeister
Studio Works

2000 
Will Bruder
James Corner
David M. Kelley
Ted Muehling
Gary Panter
Paula Scher

1999 
Pablo Ferro
Peter Girardi
John Maeda
Karim Rashid
Jesse Reiser/Nanako Umemoto
Gael Towey

1998 
Erik Adigard/Patricia McShane
April Greiman
Steven Holl
Mars Pathfinder Team
Bruce Mau
Tod Williams/Billie Tsien

1997 
Diller Scofidio + Renfro Elizabeth Diller/Ricardo Scofidio
Edward Fella
Chuck Hoberman
Lisa Krohn
Burt Rutan
Allan Wexler

1996 
Matthew Carter
Niels Diffrient
Craig Hodgetts/Hsin-Ming Fung
Tibor Kalman
Matt Scogin/Merrill Elam
Richard Saul Wurman

1995 
Frank O. Gehry
Robert M. Greenberg
Ralf Hotchkiss
ReVerb (Somi Kim, Whitney Lowe, Lisa Nugent, Susan Parr, Lorraine Wild)
James Wines
Philip Zimmermann

1994 
Muriel Cooper
Zuzana Licko/Rudy VanderLans
Katherine McCoy/Michael McCoy
Achva Benzinberg
John H. Todd/Nancy Jack Todd
Lebbeus Woods

1993 
Apple Industrial Design Group
Cross Colours
John Hejduk
Ellen Lupton/J. Abbott Miller
Paul MacCready
Gaetano Pesce

References 

Design awards